This is a list of episodes from the anime series Kiddy Grade, which ran for 24 episodes between 2002 and 2003.

References
 Kiddy Grade: Encounter of Shadow-Work
 Kiddy Grade: Episode Guide

Episodes
Kiddy Grade